This is a list of the Lebanon national football team results from 2010 to 2019.

Lebanon missed out the World Cups in 2010, 2014 and 2018, as well as the Asian Cups of 2011 and 2015; the team, however, managed to qualify for the 2019 Asian Cup for the first time in history (with the only other previous experience in the Asian Cup being in 2000, when Lebanon hosted the event). They managed their first ever victory in the competition on 17 January 2019, with a 4–1 win over North Korea. However, it would not be enough to qualify Lebanon to the knock-out stages of the tournament. 

The national team also went through both its worst and best rankings in history: 178th, from April to May 2011, and 77th, in September 2018.

Results

2010

2011

2012

2013

2014

2015

2016

2017

2018

2019

Notes

References

External links
Lebanon fixtures on FIFA.com
Lebanon fixtures on eloratings.net

2010s in Lebanese sport
2010-19